I'm Yours may refer to:

 I'm Yours (film), a 2011 Canadian film
 I'm Yours (Linda Clifford album), 1980
 I'm Yours (Linda Davis album), 1998
 "I'm Yours" (Linda Davis song), 1998
 I'm Yours (Sizzla album), 2017
 "I'm Yours" (1952 song), a song written by Robert Mellin, also covered by Eddie Fisher and others
 "I'm Yours (Use Me Anyway You Wanna)", a 1971 song made popular by Ike and Tina Turner 
 "I'm Yours" (Elvis Presley song), 1961
 "I'm Yours" (Jason Mraz song), 2008
 "I'm Yours" (Ringo Starr song), 1998
 "I'm Yours", by Alessia Cara from Know-It-All
 "I'm Yours", by Billie Holiday from The Complete Commodore & Decca Masters
 "I'm Yours", by Brandy Norwood from Brandy
 "I'm Yours", by The Script from The Script

See also 
 Cuerpo y Alma / I'm Yours, a 2000 album by Soraya
 I'm Yours, You're Mine, a 1997 album by Betty Carter
 I Am Yours (disambiguation)